Le cap perdu (The Lost Cape) is a 1931 British-made drama film directed by Ewald André Dupont and starring Harry Baur, Henri Bosc and Jean-Max. It was a French-language version of the film Cape Forlorn made by British International Pictures intended for distribution in France. A German-language version Menschen im Käfig was also released. It was based on a story by Frank Harvey.

Partial cast
 Harry Baur - Le Capitaine Kell
 Henri Bosc - Kingsley
 Jean Max - Le matelot Cass
 Marcelle Romée - Hélène

References

External links

1931 films
1931 drama films
1930s French-language films
British multilingual films
Films directed by E. A. Dupont
British drama films
British black-and-white films
1931 multilingual films
Works set in lighthouses
Films shot at British International Pictures Studios
1930s British films